Benita Jean Edds (born 12 June 1958 in Sullivan) is an American former archer.

Life

Edds graduated from Indiana State University in 1981 gaining a major in life science and medical technology. She later became a chemist for Eli Lilly and dog breeder. She was inducted into the Indiana State University Athletics Hall of Fame in 1998.

Archery

Edds competed in the 1984 Summer Olympic Games. She came 34th with 2366 points scored in the women's individual event.

References

External links 
 Profile on worldarchery.org

1956 births
Living people
American female archers
Olympic archers of the United States
Archers at the 1984 Summer Olympics
People from Sullivan, Indiana
Indiana State University alumni
Dog breeders
American chemists
21st-century American women